ShinyHunters is a criminal black-hat hacker group that is believed to have formed in 2020 and is said to have been involved in numerous data breaches. The stolen information is often sold on the dark web.

Name and alias 
The Twitter profile of the group maintains a shiny Pokémon profile picture, indicating that the name is possibly derived from the game of the same name. Within the game, players spend hours hunting for rare shiny Pokémon. This may lend credence to the group's motivation: hunting for shiny or rare artefacts, which is, for them, user data.

Notable data breaches 

Tokopedia: On 2 May 2020 Tokopedia was breached by Shinyhunters, which claimed to have data for 91 million user accounts, revealing users' gender, location, username, full name, email address, phone number, and hashed passwords.
Wishbone: Also in May 2020, ShinyHunters leaked the full user database of Wishbone, which is said to contain personal information such as usernames, emails, phone numbers, city/state/country of residence, and hashed passwords.
Microsoft: In May 2020, ShinyHunters also claimed to have stolen over 500 GB of Microsoft source code from the company's private GitHub account. The group published around 1GB of data from the hacked GitHub account to a hacking forum. Some cybersecurity experts doubted the claims until analyzing the code; upon analysis, ShinyHunters' claims were no longer in question. Microsoft told WIRED Magazine in a statement that they are aware of the breach. Microsoft later secured their GitHub account, which was confirmed by ShinyHunters as they reported being unable to access any repositories.
Wattpad: In July 2020, ShinyHunters gained access to the Wattpad database containing 270 million user records. Information leaked included usernames, real names, hashed passwords, email addresses, geographic location, gender, and date of birth.
Pluto TV: In November 2020, it was reported that ShinyHunters gained access to the personal data of 3.2 million Pluto TV users. The hacked data included users' display names, email addresses, IP addresses, hashed passwords and dates of birth.
Animal Jam: It was also reported in November 2020 that ShinyHunters was behind the hack of Animal Jam, leading to the exposure of 46 million accounts.
 Mashable: In November 2020, ShinyHunters leaked 5.22GB worth of the Mashable database on a prominent hacker forum.
Pixlr: In January 2021, ShinyHunters leaked 1.9 million user records from Pixlr.
Nitro PDF: In January 2021, a hacker claiming to be a part of ShinyHunters leaked the full database of Nitro PDF — which contains 77 million user records — on a hacker forum for free.
 Bonobos: Also in January 2021 it was reported that ShinyHunters leaked the full Bonobos backup cloud database to a hacker forum. The database is said to contain the address, phone numbers, and order details for 7 million customers; general account information for another 1.8 million registered customers; and 3.5 million partial credit card records and hashed passwords.
 Aditya Birla Fashion and Retail: In December 2021, Indian retailer Aditya Birla Fashion and Retail were breached and ransomed. The ransom demand was allegedly rejected and data containing 5.4M unique email addresses were subsequently dumped publicly on a popular hacking forum the next month. The data contained extensive personal customer information including names, phone numbers, physical addresses, DoBs, order histories and passwords stored as MD5 hashes

Other data breaches 
The following are other hacks that have been credited to or allegedly done by ShinyHunters. The estimated impacts of user records affected are also given.

JusPay - 100 million user records
Zoosk - 30 million user records
Chatbooks -15 million user records
SocialShare - 6 million user records
Home Chef - 8 million user records
Minted - 5 million user records
Chronicle of Higher Education - 3 million user records
GuMim - 2 million user records
Mindful - 2 million user records
Bhinneka - 1.2 million user records
StarTribune - 1 million user records
Dave.com- 7.5 million users
Drizly.com - 2.4 million user records
Havenly - 1.3 million user records
Hurb.com - 20 million user records
Indabamusic - 475,000 user records
Ivoy.mx - 127,000 user records
Mathway - 25.8 million user records
Proctoru - 444,000 user records
Promo.com - 22 million user records
Rewards1- 3 million user records
Scentbird - 5.8 million user records
Swvl - 4 million user records
Glofox - Unknown
Truefire - 602,000 user records
Vakinha - 4.8 million user records
Appen.com - 5.8 million user records
Styleshare - 6 million user records
Bhinneka - 1.2 million user records
Unacademy - 22 million user records
Aditya Birla Fashion and Retail - 5.4 million user records

Lawsuits 
ShinyHunters group is under investigation by the FBI, the Indonesian police, and the Indian police for the Tokopedia breach. Tokopedia's CEO and founder also confirmed this claim via a statement on Twitter.

Minted company reported the group's hack to US federal law enforcement authorities; the investigation is underway.

Administrative documents from California reveal how ShinyHunters' hack has led to Mammoth Media, the creator of the app Wishbone, getting hit with a class-action lawsuit.

Animal Jam stated that they are preparing to report ShinyHunters to the FBI Cyber Task Force and notify all affected emails. They have also created a 'Data Breach Alert' on their site to answer questions related to the breach.

BigBasket filed a First Information Report (FIR) on November 6, 2020, to the Bengaluru Police to investigate the incident.

Dave also initiated an investigation against the group for the company's security breach. The investigation is ongoing and the company is coordinating with local law enforcement and the FBI.

Wattpad stated that they reported the incident to law enforcement and engaged third-party security experts to assist them in an investigation.

Arrests
In May 2022, Sébastien Raoult, a French programmer suspected of belonging to the group, was arrested in Morocco and is awaiting extradition to the United States. He faces 20 to 116 years in prison.

References

Hacker groups
Hacking in the 2020s